Eno railway station is situated in Eno, North Karelia, Finland. This rural station is the first stop north of Joensuu station on the VR railway line between Joensuu and Nurmes. The station is normally only served by two passenger trains each way every day.

See also 
 VR (Finnish Railways)

External links 
 Station information on VR website

Railway stations in North Karelia
Railway stations opened in 1910
Joensuu